Bent Egsmark Christensen (born 2 February 1963) is a Danish football coach and former player who is the head coach of Odder IGF. In his active career, Christensen played as a midfielder, who spent his career with Værløse BK, Lyngby FC and BSC Young Boys, and played four games for the Denmark national football team.

External links
Danish national team profile
Haslund.info profile
B 1903 first team

1963 births
Living people
Danish men's footballers
Denmark international footballers
Lyngby Boldklub players
BSC Young Boys players
Lyngby Boldklub managers
Brønshøj BK managers
Association football midfielders
Danish football managers
People from Furesø Municipality
Odder IGF managers
Danish 1st Division managers
Sportspeople from the Capital Region of Denmark